Peterdick "Peter" Nicolaï (born 28 June 1947) is a Dutch lawyer and politician of the Party for the Animals. He has served as a member of the Senate since 11 June 2019.

Early life and education 
Nicolaï was born on 28 June 1947 in Amsterdam, North Holland. He received a doctorate from the University of Amsterdam in 1990.

Career 
In 1968, during his studies at the University of Amsterdam, Nicolaï started working as an assistant professor at the university's law faculty. He was later promoted to associate professor, which he remained until 2018.

Nicolaï has been active as a lawyer since 1985. Having specialised in administrative law, he has often proceeded against the Dutch government, representing various (environmental) activist groups. From 1989 to 2004, he worked as a professor of public law at the Open University of the Netherlands.

In the 2019 Senate election, Nicolaï was elected as a member of the Senate on behalf of the Party for the Animals. He was installed on 11 June 2019.

Personal life 
Nicolaï resides in Amsterdam and has four children: two sons from his marriage with Ineke Lodder (married 1972), and two daughters from his marriage with Marynka Krylova (married 1992). His youngest daughter is singer Mia Nicolai. He is currently unmarried.

References 

Living people
1947 births
20th-century Dutch lawyers
21st-century Dutch lawyers
21st-century Dutch politicians
Dutch legal educators
Dutch legal scholars
Dutch legal writers
Lawyers from Amsterdam
Members of the Senate (Netherlands)
Party for the Animals politicians
Politicians from Amsterdam
University of Amsterdam alumni
Academic staff of the University of Amsterdam